Es'hail 2 (a.k.a. Qatar-OSCAR 100 or QO-100) is a Qatari satellite, launched aboard a SpaceX Falcon 9 rocket on November 15, 2018. Es'hail 2 was built by Japan's Mitsubishi Electric company, and operates at 26° East longitude along a geostationary orbit to provide direct-to-home television services in the Middle East and North Africa region. 
The satellite features 24 Ku-band and 11 Ka-band transponders to provide direct broadcasting services for television, government and commercial content distribution. In addition to commercial services, the payload of Es'hail 2 includes a linear transponder with a bandwidth of 500 kHz and 8 MHz for the amateur radio satellite service, with uplink on 2.4 GHz (13-cm band) and downlink on 10.45 GHz (3-cm band).

Amateur radio transponders

"NB" Transponder (narrow band) 

Linear Transponder for low power narrow bandwidth voice, morse and digital communication

 preferred modes: narrow band modes like SSB and CW, PSK
 500 kHz allocated bandwidth
 non-inverting bent-pipe transponder
 Assumes 50 simultaneous 2-way carriers to serve 100 users
 X-Band Downlink (SAT-TV dish):
 90 cm dishes in rainy areas at EOC like Brazil or Thailand
 60 cm around coverage peak
 75 cm dishes at peak -2 dB
 Downlink polarisation on X-Band is vertical
 Uplink polarisation on S-Band is RHCP
 Uplink transmitter 5-10W PEP (22.5 dBi antenna gain, 75 cm dish)

The narrowband transponder is intended for conventional analogue and narrowband digital signals.

No transmissions should be made beyond the nominal edges of the transponder passbands. In particular, no operation should take place below the lower beacon nor above the upper beacon.

No uplinks should result in downlink signals that are stronger than these beacons. In the event that such signals are detected, they will be marked by a “LEILA” (LEIstungs Limit Anzeige, English: power level indicator) siren. When they have been marked by “LEILA”, operators should immediately reduce their uplink power (ERP).

No FM transmissions should be made to Es’hail-2 as these would use excessive power and bandwidth.

"WB" Transponder (wide band) 

Linear Transponder for Digital Amateur Television (DATV) and other highspeed data transmissions. First DATV transponder in space.

 8 MHz bandwidth (1.5 MHz used by beacon)
 Uplink polarisation on S-Band is RHCP
 Downlink polarisation on X-Band is horizontal
 Beacon sending video from launch at 10491.500 MHz DVB-S2 QPSK 1.5MS FEC 4/5
 DVB-S2 is used as standard in most amateur transmissions
 3 channels for wide (1000/1500 kS) transmissions, 14 channels for narrow (333 kS) transmissions, and 27 channels for very narrow (125/66/33 kS) transmissions
 Typical amateur data streams are between 400 and 1200 kbit 
 Internet spectrum monitor and chat for transmission coordination
 Receive equipment on downlink:
 90 cm offset dish
 standard Ku-band LNB 
 F6DZP MiniTiouner, Octagon SF4008 or SDR software decoders
 Uplink equipment:
 120 cm dish (preferably larger)
 Minimum 30W of output power
 SDR (Adalm-Pluto, LimeSDR, BladeRF)
All uplink transmissions should use the minimum power possible. QPSK transmissions should have a downlink signal with at least 1 dB lower power density than the Beacon – the web-based spectrum monitor enables users to set their uplink power to achieve this.  Transmissions with symbol rates of less than 333 kS using 8PSK, 16 APSK or 32 APSK should use the minimum power density required to achieve successful reception.

Amateur Radio Operators 

Well over 130+ amateur radio operators have used the amateur radio transponder in the first few weeks of operation.

See also
 Es'hailSat
 Es'hail 1

References

Satellites using the DS2000 bus
SpaceX commercial payloads
Spacecraft launched in 2018
Communications satellites in geostationary orbit
Space program of Qatar
2018 in Qatar